Homborsund is a village in Grimstad municipality in Agder county, Norway.

Location
The village is located on the Skagerrak coast in the Eide area of southern Grimstad.  The village of Jortveit is located just north of Homborsund.  For statistical purposes the population of the two villages is counted together as area 3524 Jortveit, being 662 in 2016.

Points of interest
The village includes the coastal protected recreational areas of Kalvehageneset and Hoveneset. Hoveneset was sold by Magnus Nymann, a former village priest, to the local authority in order to protect it from development by holidaymakers as the local area is a popular place to own a holiday cabin. This is commemorated by a small cairn near the shore inscribed with Bible verses and poetry by Thomas Kingo.

The Homborsund Lighthouse lies a short distance off shore, on the island of Store Grønningen.

Homborsund is home to a micro brewery, Homborsund Bryggeri, established in 2017.

References

Villages in Agder
Grimstad